"Know No Better" is a song by DJ trio Major Lazer from their EP of the same name. The song is a collaboration with Cuban-American singer Camila Cabello and American rappers Travis Scott and Quavo.  It was released on June 1, 2017, as the EP's lead single. The song was written by the performers, Starrah,, and both producers, Major Lazer member Diplo and King Henry. Jr Blender served as an additional producer for the song.

Composition

"Know No Better" comprises grand piano chords, dancehall rhythms and pitch-shifted vocal samples.

Critical reception
"Know No Better" received positive reviews from music critics. Jake Woolf of Pitchfork wrote that "Know No Better is a fine 2017 summer dance song. It’s guaranteed to be a hit, and it shows that Major Lazer can indeed make lightning strike twice," He added, "Using the same general song structure as 'Cold Water,' 'Know No Better' doesn’t feature a traditional chorus but a dance break led by a bubbly, buzzing synth. The bouncy piano-driven verses and the almost vocal-less chorus make for a sound that seems built for Ibiza vacations, rooftop raves, and 4AM DJ sets in the Hamptons—in other words, the places you’re likely to find Diplo and his fans all summer. Travis Scott, who has in the past year pivoted to become one of hip-hop’s best sing-first rappers, has never sounded more pop, using his signature ad-libs more sparingly than ever. He also swaps out traditional hip-hop bravado for boilerplate party lyrics (“Takin’ shots, pourin’ bottle after bottle after bottle/Yeah, hell nah, we ain’t sippin’ that, yah”)". Jonah Bromwich of Pitchfork also gave the song a positive review, stating that: "And as fun as it is at times, 'Know No Better' doubles as a testament to the result of spreading a handful of good ideas too thin."

Accolades

Track listing

Music video
The official lyric video for "Know No Better" was uploaded to Major Lazer's YouTube channel on June 1, 2017.

The song's music video premiered on July 11. The clip follows a young aspiring dancer who is going through an awkward adolescent phase, morning routines and bullying at school, but dreams of being one of Major Lazer's back-up dancers. It features cameos by Cabello, Scott and Major Lazer members. Daydreaming works as his escape, since the one constant between both worlds is his love of dance, as noted by writer Ryan Reed of Rolling Stone. An interactive version of this video, directed by Philip Andelman, was released on July 28 and hosted by interactive-video people Eko, where users (just like the boy does in the original) can switch between the "dream" and "reality" storylines.

Credits and personnel
Credits adapted from the liner notes of Know No Better.<ref
 name="notes"></ref>

Publishing
 Published by I Like Turtles / SONGS Music Publishing (ASCAP), Songs Music Publishing  LLC o/b/o Duke City Music / Songs Music Publishing (SESAC), People Over Planes/These Are Songs of Pulse (ASCAP), Huncho YRN Music (ASCAP) / Quality Control QC Pro (ASCAP) Universal Music Corp. (ASCAP), Maidmetal Limited / Milamoon Songs – Administered by Sony/ATV Songs LLC (BMI), La Flame Enterprises (BMI)
 Travis Scott appears courtesy of G.O.O.D. Music/Def Jam, Epic Records/Sony Music Entertainment, Grand Hustle
 Camila Cabello appears courtesy of Epic Records
 Quavo appears courtesy of Quality Control Music

Recording
 Recorded at Blenders Ends (Hamburg, Germany)
 Camila Cabello vocal recorded at Lazer Sound Studio (Los Angeles, CA)
 Quavo vocals recorded at Lazer Sound Studio (Los Angeles, CA)
 Mixed at Mixstar Studios (Virginia Beach, Virginia)
 Mastered at Derkart Mastering (Los Angeles, CA)

Personnel
 Diplo – DJ, songwriting, production
 King Henry – DJ, songwriting, production
 Travis Scott – vocals, songwriting
 Camila Cabello – vocals, songwriting
 Quavo – vocals, songwriting
 Starrah – songwriting
 Serban Ghenea – mixing
 John Hanes – engineering
 Mike Dell – mastering
 Jr Blender – additional production

Charts

Weekly charts

Year-end charts

Certifications

References

2017 singles
2017 songs
Major Lazer songs
Travis Scott songs
Camila Cabello songs
Quavo songs
Bad Bunny songs
Songs written by Diplo
Song recordings produced by Diplo
Songs written by Starrah
Songs written by Camila Cabello
Songs written by Quavo
Moombahton songs
Songs written by King Henry (producer)
Songs written by Travis Scott
Music videos directed by Philip Andelman
Dancehall songs